Donaldson is a census-designated place (CDP) in Frailey Township, Schuylkill County, Pennsylvania, United States.  The population was 325 at the 2000 census.

Geography
Donaldson is located at  (40.635945, -76.405545).

Demographics

At the 2000 census there were 325 people, 128 households, and 86 families living in the CDP. The population density was 2,978.6 people per square mile (1,140.8/km). There were 148 housing units at an average density of 1,356.4/sq mi (519.5/km).  The racial makeup of the CDP was 99.38% White, 0.31% Asian, and 0.31% from two or more races. Hispanic or Latino of any race were 0.31%.

Of the 128 households 32.0% had children under the age of 18 living with them, 52.3% were married couples living together, 7.0% had a female householder with no husband present, and 32.8% were non-families. 27.3% of households were one person and 13.3% were one person aged 65 or older. The average household size was 2.54 and the average family size was 3.10.

The age distribution was 27.1% under the age of 18, 6.8% from 18 to 24, 24.6% from 25 to 44, 22.8% from 45 to 64, and 18.8% 65 or older. The median age was 37 years. For every 100 females, there were 99.4 males. For every 100 females age 18 and over, there were 100.8 males.

The median household income was $30,750 and the median family income  was $33,750. Males had a median income of $29,750 versus $18,977 for females. The per capita income for the CDP was $12,455. About 5.0% of families and 5.0% of the population were below the poverty line, including 2.2% of those under age 18 and 1.9% of those age 65 or over.

References

Census-designated places in Schuylkill County, Pennsylvania
Census-designated places in Pennsylvania